Norman Charles Harris  (10 April 1887 – 3 May 1963) was a decorated World War I army engineer and Chairman of Commissioners of the Victorian Railways from 1940 – 1950.

Norman Charles Harris attended Scotch College, Melbourne and studied engineering at McGill University in Montreal. He worked for the Canadian Pacific Railway followed by the Hydro-Electric Power Co. in Tasmania and in 1913 became a draftsman for the Victoria Railways and then joining his father in the rolling stock division.

During World War I he served on the Western Front with the 2nd Divisional Engineers. He organised trench improvements and the construction of four bridges over the River Ancre near Albert, Somme. He was awarded the Military Cross and a Distinguished Service Order. After the war, he spent some time in England, studying their railway system.

Returning to Melbourne in 1919, he became Assistant Chief Mechanical Engineer in 1922, Chief Mechanical Engineer in 1928, a Commissioner in 1933, and Chairman of Commissioners in 1940.

The blue Melbourne Suburban Electric Harris trains were named after him in 1956.

References

1887 births
1963 deaths
Australian public servants
Australian recipients of the Military Cross
Australian Companions of the Distinguished Service Order
Australian military personnel of World War I
People educated at Scotch College, Melbourne
McGill University Faculty of Engineering alumni
People from Moonee Ponds, Victoria
Military personnel from Melbourne
Australian businesspeople in transport
Australian railway civil engineers
Businesspeople from Melbourne
Engineers from Melbourne